Joseph Wheeler Bloodgood (May 15, 1926 – July 7, 1960) was a member of the Wisconsin State Assembly.

Bloodgood was born in Madison, Wisconsin. He attended the University of Wisconsin High School before graduating from the University of Wisconsin in 1948 and working for the United States Census Bureau in 1949 and 1950. In 1954, Bloodgood received his law degree from the University of Wisconsin Law School. (His great-grandfather, Stanley Matthews, had served on the Supreme Court of the United States.)

During World War II and the Korean War, he served in the United States Navy's Pacific Fleet.

From 1951 to 1954 as a Democrat, Bloodgood was coroner of Dane County, Wisconsin. Bloodgood was elected to the Assembly in 1954. He served as the Dane County District Attorney until April 1960, when he was elected to serve as Dane County's first family court judge.

He committed suicide three months later at a hospital in Madison, Wisconsin, where he was receiving psychiatric treatment.

References

1926 births
1960 suicides
20th-century American lawyers
20th-century American judges
Wisconsin state court judges
American coroners
United States Navy personnel of World War II
United States Navy personnel of the Korean War
Military personnel from Wisconsin
University of Wisconsin–Madison alumni
University of Wisconsin Law School alumni
American politicians who committed suicide
Suicides in Wisconsin
People from Madison, Wisconsin
20th-century American politicians
Democratic Party members of the Wisconsin State Assembly